The Directorate of Geology and Mines is an agency of the Costa Rican government. Its mission includes providing consulting services for mining and geoscience research.

The Directorate of Geology and Mines is a member of the Association of Geological and Mining in Latin America (ASGMI) and actively participates in their annual meetings, assuming the presidency of the association during the 2010-2011 and 2011–2012.

Directors
 Marlene Salazar Alvarado

References

National geological agencies
Geological surveys